Orest Kryvoruchko (Ukrainian: Орест Іва́нович Кривору́чко; 9 May 1942 – 26 March 2021) was a Ukrainian artist. He was awarded Honored Artist of Ukraine in 2005.

References

Artists from Chernivtsi
1942 births
2021 deaths
Recipients of the title of Merited Artist of Ukraine